SIGCSE is the Association for Computing Machinery's (ACM) Special Interest Group (SIG) on Computer Science Education (CSE), which provides a forum for educators to discuss issues related to the development, implementation, and/or evaluation of computing programs, curricula, and courses, as well as syllabi, laboratories, and other elements of teaching and pedagogy. SIGCSE is also the name of one of the four annual conferences organized by SIGCSE. 

The main focus of SIGCSE is higher education, and discussions include improving computer science education at high school level and below. The membership level has held steady at around 3300 members for several years. The current chair of SIGCSE is Alison Clear for July 1, 2022 to June 30, 2025.

Conferences
SIGCSE has four annual conferences.

 The SIGCSE Technical Symposium on Computer Science Education is held in the United States with an average annual attendance of approximately 1800 in recent years. The next conference will be held March 11 through March 14, 2020 in Portland, Oregon.
 The annual conference on Innovation and Technology in Computer Science Education (ITiCSE). The next ITiCSE will be held June 26 - July 1 virtually, hosted by Paderborn University in Paderborn, Germany. This conference is attended by about 200-300 and is mainly held in Europe, but has also been held in countries outside of Europe (Turkey - 2010), (Israel - 2012), and (Peru - 2016).
 The International Computing Education Research (ICER) conference. This conference has about 70 attendees and is held in the United States every other year. On the alternate years it rotates between Europe and Australasia. The next conference will be held August 10-12, 2020 in Dunedin, New Zealand.
 The ACM Global Computing Education (CompEd) conference. This conference will be held at locations outside of the typical North American and European locations. The first annual conference was held in Chengdu, China between the 17th and 19th of May 2019.

Newsletter/Bulletin
The SIGCSE Bulletin is a quarterly newsletter that was first published in 1969. It evolved from an informal gathering of news and ideas to a venue for columns, editor-reviewed articles, research announcements, editorials, symposium proceedings, etc.

In 2010, with the inception of ACM Inroads magazine, the Bulletin was transformed into an electronic newsletter sent to all SIGCSE members providing communications about SIGCSE: announcing activities, publicizing events, and highlighting topics of interest. In other words, it has returned to its roots.

Awards
SIGCSE has two main awards that are given out annually.

Outstanding Contribution Award

The SIGCSE Award for Outstanding Contribution to Computer Science Education is given annually since 1981.

Lifetime Service Award
The SIGCSE Life Service to Computer Science Education has been awarded annually since 1997.

SIGCSE Board
The current SIGCSE Board for July 1, 2019 – June 30, 2022 is:

 Adrienne Decker, Chair
Amber Settle, Past Chair
 Dan Garcia, Vice-Chair
 Andrew Luxton-Reilly, Treasurer
 Leo Porter, Secretary
 Mary Anne Egan, at-large member
 Laurie Murphy, at-large member
 Manuel Perez-Quinones, at-large member

SIGCSE Chairs over the years:

 Amber Settle, 2016-19
 Susan H. Rodger, 2013–16
 Renee McCauley, 2010-2013
 Barbara Boucher Owens, 2007–10
 Henry Walker, 2001-2007
 Bruce Klein, 1997-01
 , 1993–97
 Nell B. Dale, 1991–93

References

Association for Computing Machinery Special Interest Groups
Computer science education